Ralph Emmanuel Didier "Deej" Babet (born 29 June 1983) is an Australian politician and a member of the United Australia Party. He was elected to represent  Victoria in the Australian Senate at the 2022 Australian federal election, commencing his six-year term on 1 July 2022.

Early life and career 
Babet was born on 29 June 1983 in Rodrigues, Mauritius. He and his family migrated to Australia in 1990 when he was seven years old, and he became an Australian citizen in 1993. He spoke French as his first language.

Babet grew up in Doveton, attending the Holy Family Catholic Primary School and later St John's Regional College in Dandenong. He holds the degree of Bachelor of Business from Swinburne University of Technology and an advanced diploma in sales and marketing from the Chisholm Institute.

On Christmas Day 2014 in Toorak, Babet was charged with criminal damage.  On 6 March 2017, a criminal damage charge was recorded but no conviction was given by the Melbourne Magistrates' Court: he was instead ordered to participate in a diversion program.

On 6 September 2015, he was charged with unlawful assault in South Melbourne. Babet pleaded guilty to the charges at the Melbourne Magistrates Court on 22 August 2018. In exchange for Babet's compliance with a bond/undertaking, the charges were dismissed.

Together with his brother Matt, Babet runs a real estate firm. His brother unsuccessfully contested the seat of Bruce in the 2022 federal election.

Political career 
Babet renounced his Mauritian citizenship in March 2022, just under a month before the federal election was called to avoid being disqualified from the Australian Parliament by Section 44 of the Constitution of Australia.

While United Australia Party Chairman Clive Palmer ran a candidate in every seat and spent a reported $100,000,000 on the campaign, Babet was the sole success for the UAP at the 2022 federal election by taking the sixth Victorian senate seat from the Liberal Party's Greg Mirabella. According to psephologist Antony Green's analysis of the Victorian Senate Election, Babet's win was due to strong One Nation preference flows once One Nation was excluded. Green went on to say that once Babet was ahead he could lose only if Mirabella's preferences flowed to Labor, which was unlikely since the Coalition's how-to-vote card had recommended second preference to the United Australia Party.

On 8 September 2022, Babet's party the United Australia Party was voluntarily deregistered by the Australian Electoral Commission. Babet stated the deregistration was made for "administrative reasons" and that he would continue to represent the deregistered party in the Senate. Babet is able to continue identifying as a United Australia Party member in the Senate, with the office of the Clerk of the Senate stating that Babet’s status as a UAP senator would not change until he advised the office otherwise.

Political views 
Babet says that he stands for freedom and individual liberties. He is against vaccine mandates and the "ever-growing power and authoritarianism of the government", and he believes the mandates are "segregation". He purports to be unvaccinated for COVID-19, considering the vaccine to be "emergency gene therapy".

During the campaign he said his first order of business will be to push for a Bill of Rights. Once a Greens voter, he now considers the ideology of the Greens to be "cancerous to a free and open society". He does not consider the science of climate change to be "settled" or believe that humans are responsible for the cause. He claims that there are an equal amount of scientists on either side of the debate. On energy solutions he believes "solar panels and batteries are bad for the environment".

Babet says he is "not happy" with transgender issues being taught at schools, saying he disagrees with "little boys and girls being taught that you can be a boy one day and a girl the next day".

Babet has promoted a number of conspiracy theories, including that the 2022 election was going to be rigged, that the Great Reset initiative of the World Economic Forum is a plot to create a tyrannical world government and is "trying to do away with the concept of private ownership".

Babet has been openly critical of the "billionaire circus" that he perceives to be the World Economic Forum, while at the same time praising some billionaires including Clive Palmer, who funded the electoral campaign which won Babet's seat, and Elon Musk. In his opening Senate speech, Babet spoke of his disdain for 'radical Marxists'.

Babet considers his $200,000 salary a "pay cut" and believes that it is too little for the "suffering" that he will endure in parliament and that he would "be happier" staying in Narre Warren running his real estate business. Days before his term started, Babet told an interviewer he had no intention of running for more than one term.

Personal life 
Babet is Catholic.

References

External links 
 Parliamentary Profile

Living people
Members of the Australian Senate
Members of the Australian Senate for Victoria
Mauritian emigrants to Australia
Australian real estate agents
United Australia Party (2013) members of the Parliament of Australia
United Australia Party (2013) politicians
People from Rodrigues
Independent politicians
Australian conspiracy theorists
1983 births
Swinburne University of Technology alumni
People from the City of Casey